Ciricito is a corregimiento in Colón District, Colón Province, Panama with a population of 2,900 as of 2010. Its population as of 1990 was 2,108; its population as of 2000 was 2,402.

References

Corregimientos of Colón Province